HMS Vancouver was a British V-class destroyer. She was launched on 28 December 1917; in July 1922 she accidentally rammed the submarine . She was renamed HMS Vimy in April 1928. She served with distinction during World War II, earning two battle honours and damaging or sinking three enemy submarines. The Royal Navy retired her in 1945 and she was scrapped in 1948.

Service history

Service during World War II
In September 1939 she was part of the 11th Destroyer Flotilla. On 6 February 1940, Vimy rescued the sole survivor of a crew of four from an Avro Anson that had crashed into the sea while escorting a convoy.

In May 1940 she participated in the Dunkirk evacuation. Anticipating the need, the Royal Navy had sent 200 seaman and marines aboard Vimy, to organise the port of Boulogne on 23 May. At one point,  fired at her but without result as the torpedoes were faulty. Also on 28 May, small arms fire from the shore fatally wounded Lieutenant Commander Colin Donald, her captain, and killed the officer of the watch, Sub Lieutenant Webster. Lt Cdr Donald was carried below and died in hospital in Dover; the first lieutenant who was summoned from the upper deck,Lieutenant Adrian Northey
( DSC,Despatches), took temporary command for two days between 28.05.40 and 30.05.40. Lieutenant Commander Donald's replacement as captain was found to be missing on the second day of the Dunkirk evacuation, and the crew searched the entire vessel for him without result.

On 1 June, Vimy collided with and sank the yacht Amulree in the Gull Channel, to the west of the Goodwin Sands. That same day an air attack caused some damage. During the evacuation of Dunkirk, Vimy transported 2,976 troops; for her efforts she received the battle honours "Dunkirk 1940".

In 1941 she was reconstructed to long range escort, the work being finished in June 1941. On 21 September 1941, depth charges from Vimy damaged the Italian  , which was attempting to attack Convoy HG 73, west of Gibraltar.

On 3 September 1942, depth charges from the British destroyers Vimy,  and  sank the German submarine  in the mid-Atlantic north-east of Trinidad, in position . The U-boat had had a particularly successful year to that point, having sunk 14 vessels totaling 82,000 tons. Vimys captain, Lieutenant Commander de Chair received the DSC for this action. All but three of the submarine's crew survived to be taken prisoner. Her captain, Jürgen Wattenberg, went on to organize a break from the POW camp at Papago Park, in Arizona.

On 18 September, Vimy rescued survivors from the US merchantman , which  had sunk on 30 August.

U-187 was on her first cruise and had not had any successes. Nine of her crew members perished, including the commander, during the sinking, but Vimy and Beverley rescued 45 men from the water. Her commanding officer, Lt Cdr R B Stannard VC, received a DSO for Vimys contribution to breaking up the U-boat pack hunting SC 118.

Fate
Vimy was no longer listed as an active unit in the July 1945 Navy List. She was sold for scrap in March 1947 and was scrapped at Rosyth by Metal Industries in February 1948.

Notes

Bibliography

External links

 Vanoc class

 

V and W-class destroyers of the Royal Navy
Ships built on the River Clyde
1917 ships
World War I destroyers of the United Kingdom
World War II destroyers of the United Kingdom